Agrostophyllinae is an orchid subtribe in the tribe Epidendreae.

References

External links 

 
Orchid subtribes